Paul Mark Bruce (born 18 February 1978) is an English former professional footballer who played in the Football League as a defender.

References

1978 births
Living people
Footballers from Lambeth
English footballers
Association football defenders
Queens Park Rangers F.C. players
Cambridge United F.C. players
Dagenham & Redbridge F.C. players
St Albans City F.C. players
English Football League players